The Curiche Grande River (also known in English as the Corixa Grande River; in Brazil it is called Corixa Grande, and in Bolivia Curiche Grande) is a river of Mato Grosso state in western Brazil. It forms a portion of the international border between Brazil and Bolivia.

See also
List of rivers of Mato Grosso

References

External links
Brazilian Ministry of Transport

Rivers of Bolivia
Rivers of Mato Grosso
International rivers of South America
Bolivia–Brazil border